Heterotheca gypsophila is a rare Mexican species of flowering plant in the family Asteraceae. It has been found only in a small region in the state of Nuevo León in northeastern Mexico.

References

External links
Photo of herbarium specimen collected in Nuevo León in 1983, paratype of Heterotheca gypsophila

gypsophila
Flora of Nuevo León
Endemic flora of Mexico
Plants described in 1984
Taxa named by Billie Lee Turner